Crypsicharis is a genus of moths of the family Xyloryctidae.

Species
 Crypsicharis enthetica Meyrick, 1922
 Crypsicharis neocosma Meyrick, 1890
 Crypsicharis triplaca Lower, 1923

References

Xyloryctidae
Xyloryctidae genera